Euaresta jonesi is a species of fruit fly in the genus Euaresta of the family Tephritidae.

References

Tephritinae
Insects described in 1932
Diptera of North America